Football Club Alay Osh is a Kyrgyzstani football club based in Osh, that plays in the top division, Kyrgyz Premier League.

History

Names
1960: founded as the city of Osh.
1965: Renamed as FC Shakhtyor Osh.
1967: Renamed FC Alay Osh.
1994: Renamed FC Alay-Osh-Pirim.
1995: Renamed FC Alay Osh.
1996: Merged with Dinamo Osh to FC Dinamo-Alay Osh.
2002: Reactivated as FC Alay Osh.

Domestic history

Continental history

Honours
Kyrgyzstan League
Champions (4): 2013, 2015, 2016, 2017

Kyrgyzstan Cup
Winners (2): 2013, 2020

Players

Current squad

External links 

Football clubs in Kyrgyzstan
1967 establishments in the Soviet Union
Association football clubs established in 1967